David Handley Hutt (born 24 August 1938) is a British Anglican priest. He was Archdeacon of Westminster from 1999 to 2005.

Early life and education
Hutt was educated at Brentwood; Sandhurst; and King's College London. He was an officer in the Queen's Surreys from 1957 to 1964.

Ordained ministry
He was ordained deacon in 1969, and priest in 1970. After curacies at Bedford Park and Westminster he was Priest Vicar and Succentor of Southwark Cathedral. He was Senior Chaplain of King's College, Taunton from 1978 to 1982. He then held incumbencies at St Alban and St Patrick, Birmingham ( 1982–1986); and All Saints, Margaret Street (1986–1995). He was a Canon of Westminster from 1995 to 2006. He was also Sub-Dean of the abbey from 1999 to 2005.

Notes

20th-century English Anglican priests
21st-century English Anglican priests
1938 births
People educated at Brentwood School, Essex
Alumni of King's College London
Queen's Royal Regiment officers
Living people
Graduates of the Royal Military Academy Sandhurst
Archdeacons of Westminster
Holders of a Lambeth degree